The Códice Casanatense, its popular Portuguese title, or the Codex Casanatense 1889, is a set of 16th century Portuguese illustrations, which depict peoples and cultures whom the Portuguese frequently had contact with around the Indian and Pacific oceans. It is now kept at the Biblioteca Casanatense in Rome, with the official designation of Album di disegni, illustranti usi e costumi dei popoli d'Asia e d'Africa con brevi dichiarazioni in lingua portoghese ("Album of drawings, illustrating the uses and customs of the people of Asia and Africa with a brief description in Portuguese language").

Contents and origin
The codex consists of seventy-six watercolour illustrations, one of which is a later addition. Most come with a short description, and include illustrations of people from east Africa, Arabia, Persia, Afghanistan, India, Ceylon, Malaysia, China and the Moluccas, as well as some insights into fauna, flora and certain traditions, such as the Hindu religion — previously unknown in Europe. The creator has not been identified and many hypotheses have proven inconclusive. Several of its inscriptions provide information as to the date it was made, namely the allusion to the Siege of Diu of 1538, but the absence of any mention of the Japanese, whom the Portuguese contacted in 1541–43. It is therefore possible it was made circa 1540.

Its earliest recorded owner was the novice João da Costa of the College of St. Paul of Goa, who in 1627 sent it to Lisbon, according to information inscribed within the codex. Once in Europe, it was acquired by Cardinal Girolamo Casanata who, on his death in 1700, bequeathed it along with his private collection to the Dominican Order, for the creation of a new library, where it is now kept. It was first brought to public attention by the scholar Georg Schurhammer, who published several pictures in the Portuguese historical magazine Garcia da Horta in the 1950s.

The Códice Casanatense provides an extremely rare insight into the culture of the peoples in Africa and Asia 16th century, and is especially valuable for the study of popular arms and garments of the era.

Gallery

Abyssinia

Nubia

Cafreria

Arabia

Mesopotamia

Hormuz

Persia and Afghanistan

Sindh

Gujarat

Northern and north-eastern India

Goa and the Kanara Coast

Malabar Coast

Maldives

Coromandel Coast

Ceylon

Burma

Malacca

Indonesia

China

Miscellaneous

Hindu rituals

The Portuguese in Asia

Fauna and flora

See also
Miniature (illuminated manuscript)
Boxer Codex
Tipos del País
Ottoman miniature
Persian miniature
Mughal painting

Notes

References

External links
 Official Webpage of the Biblioteca Casanatense
 Portuguese Codice

Portugal history-related lists
Portuguese books
16th-century manuscripts